Park Key is an uninhabited island in the lower Florida Keys about  east of Key West. It is 1500 Meters long, and between 75 and 260 Meters wide (190 meters on the average). It measures  in area.

The island was made from fill, so that the railroad and later the road bed could be laid down.

U.S. 1 (or the Overseas Highway) crosses Park Key at about mile marker 18, between Lower Sugarloaf Key and Sugarloaf Key in the middle of Upper Sugarloaf Sound.  It serves only as a causeway and is uninhabited.

References

Uninhabited islands of Monroe County, Florida
Islands of Florida
Islands of the Florida Keys